Higinio Atilio López Riveros (5 February 1925 – 14 July 2016) was a Paraguayan football striker and coach.

Career

As player
López was part of the Paraguay national football team that participated in the 1950 FIFA World Cup and the 1953 Copa America, which was eventually won by Paraguay. At the club level, he played for teams like Nacional and Club Guaraní of Paraguay, Boca Juniors de Cali of Colombia, Atlético Madrid of Spain, Atlético Chalaco of Peru, and Atahualpa and Aucas of Ecuador.

As coach
After retiring from football as a player, López managed Paraguayan First Division teams like Sportivo Luqueño, Guaraní and Club Libertad. He was also in charge of the youth divisions of several teams around the country.

Titles

References

1925 births
2016 deaths
People from Villarrica, Paraguay
Paraguayan footballers
Club Nacional footballers
Club Guaraní players
Atlético Madrid footballers
Paraguayan Primera División players
Categoría Primera A players
Paraguay international footballers
1950 FIFA World Cup players
Expatriate footballers in Colombia
Expatriate footballers in Ecuador
Expatriate footballers in Peru
Expatriate footballers in Spain
Paraguayan expatriate footballers
Copa América-winning players
Association football forwards